John Robert Jackson (March 22, 1859 – January 20, 1925) was an Irish-born rancher and political figure in British Columbia. He represented Greenwood in the Legislative Assembly of British Columbia from 1909 to 1916 as a Conservative.

He was born in Drumheart, County Cavan, the son of William Jackson, and was educated in Corlisbratten. Jackson came to Ontario in 1871 and to British Columbia in 1885. In 1900, he married Agnes Barbour. Jackson was defeated by John Duncan MacLean when he ran for reelection in 1916. He died in Merritt at the age of 65.

References 

1859 births
1925 deaths
British Columbia Conservative Party MLAs
Politicians from County Cavan